Golsa "Goldie" Ghamari is a Canadian politician who was elected on June 7, 2018, to the Legislative Assembly of Ontario during the 2018 general election. She represents the riding of Carleton, and is a member of the Progressive Conservative Party of Ontario. Ghamari was called to the Bar of Ontario in 2013, and she practised international trade law before running for provincial office as a Progressive Conservative.

Education 
Ghamari holds a Bachelor of Arts from the University of Toronto and a Juris Doctor, cum laude, from the University of Ottawa, Faculty of Common Law.

Provincial Politics 
In February 2018, she made allegations against Randy Hillier, MPP for Lanark—Frontenac—Lennox and Addington. She claimed that Hiller intimidated her and tried to encourage her not to seek public office. She says the encounter took place during the 2016 Ontario PC Party convention in Ottawa. As a result of the allegations, there was an internal party investigation, but the PC party found no evidence of wrongdoing on the part of Hillier.

Law Society of Ontario 
Ghamari received her law licence in 2013 but had eight "administrative" suspensions between June 2017 and July 2019 for issues such as failure to pay her annual fee or file her annual report.

Suspended License 
Prior to being elected, Goldie Ghamari asserts that she was winding down her legal practice due to her intention to seek public office. In January 2019, Ghamari's former client launched an investigation with the LSO for failing to take action in his complaint, which caused him to lose an investment in his restaurant business. Ghamari informed the Law Society of Ontario that she cut off communication with her client based on rumours that he had ties in the past to a group designated by the federal government as a terrorist organization — an allegation not confirmed anywhere in the tribunal's ruling.

In its March 30 decision, the tribunal ruled that Ghamari, the Progressive Conservative MPP for Carleton, had "failed to co-operate" with an investigation. Ghamari shared with the tribunal that she was undergoing mental health challenges as a result of a unexpected divorce from her husband and stated that was a contributing factor to her delays. Ghamari had privacy concerns about the impact it would have on her political career and was willing to share the details the Law Society sought in a in-camera meeting.

In April 2021, news sources at The Ottawa Citizen reported that a tribunal conducted by the Law Society of Ontario had finalized their ruling to suspend Ghamari's licence to practice law suggesting Ghamari had “engaged in professional misconduct and/or conduct unbecoming a licensee.”. Allegations, according to the Law Society's draft order and sworn affidavits, cited that a former client had filed a complaint alleging that he had paid her a retainer in 2017 to help him pursue a real estate-related claim. The Client argues she didn't fulfill the terms of the retainer.

Ghamari was further accused of "utterly stonewalling" the investigation over the past two years as the Tribunal repeatedly attempted to collect relevant information, including Ghamari's call and text logs with the client covering the six-month period in question.  While Ghamari stated "I'm aware that the Law Society Act requires me to disclose relevant information.", she argued "I do believe that the Law Society should not have blanket authorization access to my political and campaign calls and records, especially because they contain highly sensitive personal information of other political people based on the nature of my position as an elected official."

Ghamari maintained her refusal to provide the information citing a PC Party Confidentiality Pact despite there being no evidence presented prior to nor during the hearing by Ghamari or her duty counsel to suggest the PC Party's confidentiality agreement would override a lawyer's obligation to disclose the requested information under the Law Society Act.

Electoral record

References

Living people
Progressive Conservative Party of Ontario MPPs
21st-century Canadian politicians
21st-century Canadian women politicians
Politicians from Ottawa
Women MPPs in Ontario
Canadian people of Iranian descent
Canadian politicians of Iranian descent
Canadian Muslims
1985 births